Charlie John Rowe (born 23 April 1996) is an English film and television actor. His film roles include Young Tommy in Never Let Me Go, James in The Boat That Rocked, Billy Costa in The Golden Compass, Peter in the SyFy/Sky Movies Peter Pan prequel Neverland, and played Leo Roth on the Fox medical comedy-drama series Red Band Society alongside Octavia Spencer and Dave Annable.

Life and career
Rowe was born in Islington, London, and grew up with a sister in Crouch End. He attended St Michael's Primary School, Highgate. His mother, Sara, is a drama teacher, and his father, Chris Rowe, is an actor and writer.

He got his start in the 2007 fantasy adventure film The Golden Compass and continued to make films throughout his young years, like SyFy's Neverland. His aunt is the English actress Claire Price, known from the drama television series Rebus.

Rowe was among the front runners for the role of Spider-Man in Captain America: Civil War'' alongside Asa Butterfield, Charlie Plummer and Tom Holland but he, Butterfield, and Plummer ultimately lost to Holland who got the part.

Rowe is based in Haringey and is studying theatre studies, English literature, music and photography.

Filmography

Film

Television

References

External links
 

1996 births
21st-century English male actors
English male child actors
English male film actors
English male television actors
Living people
Male actors from London
People from the London Borough of Islington